Sattiyakudi  is a village in the  
Avadaiyarkoilrevenue block of Pudukkottai district, Tamil Nadu, India.

Demographics 

As per the 2001 census, Sattiyakudi had a total population of 979 with 500 males and 479 females. Out of the total population 491 people were literate.

References

Villages in Pudukkottai district